Terje Venaas (born 30 March 1947 in Molde, Norway) is a Norwegian jazz musician (upright bass), known from dozens of recordings and a number of international cooperation.

Career 
Venaas started playing music within several local bands in the Molde area from 1962, among others within his brother Åge Venås Orchestra (including Geir Schumann piano and Svein Jens Thorsø). He debuted on Moldejazz in 1967, and moved to Oslo where he joined the music scene Club 7 (1967–). There he started performing with musicians like Jan Garbarek, Espen Rud and Carl Magnus Neumann, and debuted on record with Terje Rypdal in 1968.

He is one of the most prominent Norwegian jazz artists, recording with international jazz greats as within Per Husby Trio featuring Chet Baker (The improviser, Cadence Jazz Records), and performed with Dexter Gordon (Club 7, 1972), Toots Thielemans (1986), Michel Petrucciani (Kongsberg Jazz Festival, 1986).

Venaas has also been county musician in Sogn og Fjordane (1988–89), and has also collaborated with folk singer Lillebjørn Nilsen with concert tours at home and abroad and recordings, such as "Stilleste Gutt på Sovesal 1".

Honors 
Gammleng-prisen 1982 in the class Studio
Drøbak Jazzklubbs Reenskaug-pris 1984 
Buddyprisen 1988

Discography 
1968: Bleak House, with Terje Rypdal
1973: På Stengrunn, with Lillebjørn Nilsen
1983: The Improviser, with Chet Baker
1984: Live at Jazz Alive, with Thorgeir Stubø
1984: Daydreams, with Laila Dalseth
1984: The Improviser	Chet Baker, within Per Husby Orchestra feat. Chet Baker
1986: Rhythm'A'Ning, with Thorgeir Stubø
1986: I Hear a Rhapsody, with Totti Bergh
1986: Tenor Gladness, with Totti Bergh
1986: Travelling Light, with Laila Dalseth
1988: Cherokee, with Egil Kapstad
1988: Flight, with Thorgeir Stubø
1988: Groovin' High, with Per Nyhaug Studioband
1988: My Wonderful One (Gemini Records), classics with Magni Wentzel feat. Art Farmer
1989: Confessin' the Blues, with Knut Riisnæs
1990: String Time, with Louis Stewart
1992: Musikken Inni Oss, with Sigmund Groven
1993: Toner fra Romsdal (Odin Records), with Ingeborg Hungnes
1994: Om Desse Steinane Kunne Tala, with Glenn Erik Haugland
1999: Portrait of Jimmy Rosenberg, with Jimmy Rosenberg
2001: Bjørn Johansen, with Bjørn Johansen
2001: Einar Iversen, with Einar Iversen
2001: Portrait of a Norwegian Jazz Artist: Bjarne Nerem, with Bjarne Nerem
2002: Blåmann! Blåmann!, with Jan Erik Vold feat. Chet Baker
2002: Larsen and Loutchek, with Jon Larsen
2005: Swinging, with Jimmy Rosenberg
2008: Leve Patagonia (Polygram Records), with Ketil Bjørnstad
2008: Nattønsker, Sigmund Groven
2008: The Best of Jimmy Rosenberg, with Jimmy Rosenberg
2009: Portrait of Jon Larsen, with Jon Larsen
2011: Lukk Opp Kirkens Dører: A Selection of Norwegian Christian Jazz (Psych, Funk & Folk) 1970–1980

References 

1947 births
Living people
Jazz double-bassists
Norwegian jazz upright-bassists
Male double-bassists
Musicians from Molde
Gemini Records artists
Barratt Due Institute of Music alumni
21st-century double-bassists
21st-century Norwegian male musicians
Male jazz musicians